HD 111232 is a star in the southern constellation of Musca. It is too faint to be visible with the naked eye, having an apparent visual magnitude of 7.59. The distance to this star is 94.5 light years based on parallax. It is drifting away from the Sun with a radial velocity of +104 km/s, having come to within  some 264,700 years ago. The absolute magnitude of this star is 5.25, indicating it would have been visible to the naked eye at that time.

This is an ancient, thick disk population II star with an estimated age of twelve billion years. It is a G-type main-sequence star with a stellar classification of G8 V Fe-1.0, indicating an anomalous underabundance of iron in the stellar atmosphere. The star has 80% of the mass of the Sun and 88% of the Sun's radius. It is spinning slowly with a projected rotational velocity of 0.4 km/s. X-ray emission has not been detected, suggesting a low level of coronal activity. The star is radiating 70% of the luminosity of the Sun from its photosphere at an effective temperature of 5,648 K.

Planetary system
A superjovian planetary companion was detected by the CORALIE team, based on observations beginning in 2003. Planets around such metal-poor stars are rare (the only two known similar cases as of 2019 are HD 22781 and HD 181720). An astrometric measurement of the planet's inclination and true mass was published in 2022 as part of Gaia DR3. Later in 2022, these parameters were revised along with the detection of a second substellar companion, likely a brown dwarf.

References

G-type main-sequence stars
Planetary systems with one confirmed planet
Musca (constellation)
Durchmusterung objects
111232
062534
J12485177-6825304